Jūlija Levčenko (born 14 January 1989) is a Latvian footballer who plays as a forward. She has been a member of the Latvia women's national team.

References

1989 births
Living people
Latvian women's footballers
Women's association football forwards
FK Liepājas Metalurgs (women) players
Pogoń Szczecin (women) players
Latvia women's youth international footballers
Latvia women's international footballers
Latvian expatriate footballers
Latvian expatriate sportspeople in Poland
Expatriate women's footballers in Poland